The Joseon Grand Exposition(조선대박람회,朝鮮大博覽會) opened on 1 September 1940 at east East Kyǒngsǒng Station (now Seoul Station). It was organised by the Keijō Nippō newspaper.

Aims
The exhibition had three aims: to mark 2600 years of the Japanese Empire, 30 years of  Japanese Government in Korea and to prepare the population for war.

Architecture
Architecture was in modernism style, spread over 28 acres.

Pavilions included Booming of Korea, China, Manchuria and Manchurian settler's pavilion, both by the Korean-Manchurian Colonial Company, Mongolia pavilion, and Seoul.

The Holy War Street contained the Holy War Pavilion and War Achievements Pavilion both displaying battle scene dioramas and trophies from the second Sino-Japanese war.

References

1940 establishments in Korea
1940s in Seoul
Seoul
World's fairs in Korea